Flanders Callaway House was a historic home formerly located near Marthasville, Warren County, Missouri.  It was built about 1812, and was a two-story, five-bay, walnut hewn-log frontier house.  The house was typical of early Federal style log constructions found in Kentucky and Tennessee.  Its builder Flanders Callaway was a son-in-law of Daniel Boone, husband of his second eldest daughter Jemima.  Daniel Boone's funeral in 1820 was held in the barn of the Flanders Callaway homestead. The house was completely dismantled in 1968 and sold in 1979 and moved to St. Charles County for reassembly.

It was listed on the National Register of Historic Places in 1969 and delisted in 1994.

See also
Capture and rescue of Jemima Boone
James Callaway

References

External links

Log houses in the United States
Historic American Buildings Survey in Missouri
Houses on the National Register of Historic Places in Missouri
Federal architecture in Missouri
Houses completed in 1812
Buildings and structures in Warren County, Missouri
National Register of Historic Places in Warren County, Missouri